Joseph Wladislas Edmond Potocki de Montalk (14 February 1836–6 September 1901) was a New Zealand language teacher and storekeeper . He was born in Paris, France on 14 February 1836.

References

1836 births
1901 deaths
New Zealand educators
Montalk, Joseph W
Nelson College faculty